Doctor Love (also spelled Dr. Love) is a 2011 Indian Malayalam romantic comedy film written and directed by K. Biju. The film was produced by Joy Thomas Sakthikulangara, and stars Kunchacko Boban, Ananya, Bhavana, Manikuttan, Rejith Menon, and Salim Kumar. The film features songs composed by Vinu Thomas. Doctor Love was released in theatres on 9 September 2011.The movie was shot in the campus of St. Berchmans College, Changanassery.Finance controller Manoharan K, Anand G

Plot
Dr. Love is the story of Vinayachandran, is an unsuccessful romantic novel writer who helps people with love issues. Because of his ability to help people in solving love issues he gets a job as a waiter in a college canteen, that also to solve a love issue of a Professor but after entering the campus, he helps a student Sudhi to get his lover Manju and thus he becomes a hero. He is given the title Doctor Love - Romance Consultant by all the students in the campus.
Now, one of the challenges before him is to make the brash campus devil Ebin fall in love with the quiet boy Roy. Dr.Love starts working on his plan but now the story takes some dramatic twists and turns

Cast

Soundtrack

Critical reception
Rediff.com gave the film a rating of 2 out of 5 and said "Dr Love is yet another campus film". Sify also rated the movie at 2/5 and said "Dr.Love tries to present all those masala once again, but it looks amateurish to the core. Watch it at your own risk please". Indiaglitz  said "All in all, 'Dr.Love' has some interesting moments and the ensemble star cast pitches in real performances too. On the whole, the movie could be an ideal popcorn flick targeted to strike a chord with the youth and those who relish candy floss and madcap entertainers. If you are not looking for wisdom and rationale in a light-hearted entertainer, we are sure you will savour this campus carnival" and gave 2.75 stars out of 5.

References

External links
 
 

2011 films
2010s Malayalam-language films
Indian romantic comedy-drama films
2011 romantic comedy-drama films
2011 comedy films